Trichoboscis pansarista is a moth in the family Lecithoceridae. It was described by Edward Meyrick in 1929. It is found in Sikkim, India.

The wingspan is about 15 mm. The forewings are dark fuscous with undefined suffused darker spots indicating the discal stigmata. There is some ochreous-whitish suffusion on the costal edge about five-sixths, forming a small spot at the posterior extremity. The hindwings are grey.

References

Moths described in 1929
Lecithocerinae